Gyula Dávid (May 6, 1913 – March 14, 1977) was a Hungarian violist and composer.

Dávid studied composition with Zoltán Kodály at the Franz Liszt Academy of Music. He played viola with the Municipal Orchestra in Budapest from 1940 to 1943, and was a conductor at the National Theatre from 1945 to 1949.

Dávid's music can largely be divided into two periods: his early compositions were influenced by folk song, and those from his second period are more chromatic or 12-tone serial. One of the most famous compositions of his first period is his Viola Concerto (1950).

Selected works
Orchestral
 Symphony No. 1 (I. szimfónia) (1947)
 Tánczene, magyar népdalfeldolgozások (Dance Music, Based on Hungarian Folk Songs) (published 1952)
 Symphony No. 2 (II. szimfónia) (1957)
 Symphony No. 3 (III. szimfónia) (1960)
 Sinfonietta for small orchestra (1961)
 Színházi zene (Theatrical Music; Theatermusik) (published 1963)
 Symphony No. 4 (IV. szimfónia) (1970)
 Festive Overture (Ünnepi előjáték) (1972)

Concertante
 Concerto (Brácsaverseny) for viola and orchestra (1950)
 Concerto (Hegedűverseny) for violin and orchestra (published 1970)
 Concerto (Kürtverseny) for horn and orchestra (published 1976)

Chamber music
 Wind Quintet No. 1 (I. Fúvósötös) (published 1954)
 Sonata (Sonata fuvolára és zongorára) for flute and piano (published 1954)
 Serenade for wind quintet (1955)
 Preludio for flute and piano (1964)
 Wind Quintet No. 3 (III. Fúvósötös) (published 1965)
 Sonatina for viola and piano (1969)
 Miniature for 3 trumpets, 2 trombones and tuba (published 1971)
 Wind Quintet No. 4 (IV. Fúvósötös) (published 1971)
 Pezzo (Piece) for viola and piano (1974)
 Piano Trio (published 1974)
 String Quartet No. 2 (published 1976)
 Sonata for violin solo (published 1983)

Piano
 Piano Sonata (Szonáta zongorára) (1955)

Vocal
 A rózsalángolás (The Burning Rose), Chamber Music for female voice, flute and viola (1966); words by István Vas

Discography
 Gyula Dávid: Viola Concerto – Pál Lukács (viola); János Ferencsik (conductor); Hungarian State Orchestra; Hungaroton HCD31989
 Gyula Dávid: Viola Concerto, Violin Concerto, Sinfonietta – Pál Lukács (viola); Dénes Kovács (violin); János Ferencsik, Ervin Lukács, Tamás Breitner (conductors); Hungarian State Orchestra, Budapest Symphony Orchestra; Hungaroton SLPX 12452 (LP)

References
Grove Music Article on Dávid, Gyula

1913 births
1977 deaths
Hungarian classical violists
Hungarian composers
Hungarian male composers
Franz Liszt Academy of Music alumni
20th-century classical musicians
20th-century composers
20th-century Hungarian male musicians